Don Joyce may refer to:
Don Joyce (musician) (1944–2015), American musician
Don Joyce (American football) (1929–2012), American football defensive end